Tasila Lungu Mwansa (born on May 10, 1983) is a Zambian politician and philanthropist. She is a member of the Patriotic Front and is the current Member of Parliament for Chawama.

Biography
Tasila was born on May 10, 1983. At the age of 12, Tasila and her mother left Zambia for the US and returned after her father's victory in the January 2015 by-election, in which he was chosen to carry out the remainder of the late Michael Sata's term as president.

Political career
Tasila contested in the 2021 Zambian general election as MP for Chawama Constituency; and came out victorious.

Personal life
In 2020, Tasila married Patrick Mwansa.

References

Living people
1983 births
Members of the National Assembly of Zambia
Patriotic Front (Zambia) politicians